Lumba is a rural locality (a station) in Staroselskoye Rural Settlement, Vologodsky District, Vologda Oblast, Russia. The population was 3 as of 2002.

Geography 
Lumba is located 66 km west of Vologda (the district's administrative centre) by road. Semigorye is the nearest rural locality.

References 

Rural localities in Vologodsky District